Lårdal is a former municipality in Telemark county, Norway. The  municipality existed from 1838 until its dissolution in 1964. The area centered around the Lårdalen valley and it is now part of Tokke Municipality. The administrative centre was the village of Lårdal.

History
The parish of Laardal was established as a municipality on 1 January 1838 (see formannskapsdistrikt law). In 1879, there was a small border adjustment where a part of Laardal Municipality (population: 6) was transferred to Mo Municipality. During the 1960s, there were many municipal mergers across Norway due to the work of the Schei Committee. On 1 January 1964, Mo Municipality (population: 1,658) and Lårdal (population: 1,929) were merged to form a new municipality called Tokke.

Name
The municipality (originally the parish) is named after the old Laardal farm since the first Lårdal Church was built there. Historically, the municipality name was spelled "Laurdal" (although the parish name goes back centuries as Laugerdal). From 1884-1920, it was spelled "Laardal". Since 1921, it has been spelled "Lårdal".

Government
While it existed, this municipality was responsible for primary education (through 10th grade), outpatient health services, senior citizen services, unemployment and other social services, zoning, economic development, and municipal roads. During its existence, this municipality was governed by a municipal council of elected representatives, which in turn elected a mayor.

Municipal council
The municipal council  of Lårdal was made up of 21 representatives that were elected to four year terms. The party breakdown of the final municipal council was as follows:

See also
List of former municipalities of Norway

References

Tokke
Former municipalities of Norway
1838 establishments in Norway
1964 disestablishments in Norway